Hot Stove is an offseason baseball talk show that airs on MLB Network and is simulcast on MLB Network Radio. The show offers the coverage of offseason activities including trades, free agent signings, and rumors. It is taped live in "Studio K" of the MLB Network studios in Secaucus, New Jersey. Prior to its restructure to a talk show in 2012, it replaced MLB Tonight as the signature show of the network during the off season. As such it was taped live in Studio 3, but also featured segments taped in Studio 42. The program airs from after the World Series and before spring training.

Personalities

Hosts

Main 
Greg Amsinger: (2009–2011)
Victor Rojas: (2009–2010)
Matt Vasgersian: (2009–present)
Matt Yallof: (2009–2011)
Harold Reynolds: (2012–present)

Guest Hosts 
Brian Kenny: (November 20–21, 2012)
Keith Olbermann: (November 20–21, 2012)

Analysts 
Sean Casey: (2009–2011)
John Hart: (2009–2011)
Barry Larkin: (2009–2011)
Al Leiter: (2009–2011)
Joe Magrane: (2009–2011)
Dan Plesac: (2009–2011)
Harold Reynolds: (2009–2011)
Billy Ripken: (2009–2011)
Dave Valle: (2009–2011)
Mitch Williams: (2009–2014)

Reporters 
Trenni Kusnierek: (2009–2010)
Hazel Mae: (2009–2011)
Lauren Shehadi: (2012–present)
Heidi Watney: (2012–2021)
Siera Santos: (2022–present)

Insiders 
Jon Heyman: (2009–present)
Tracy Ringolsby: (2009–2011)
Ken Rosenthal: (2009–2021)
Tom Verducci: (2009–present)
Peter Gammons: (2010–present)

Commentators 
Bob Costas: (2009–2011)

Hot Stove Awards 
On February 25, 2011, during the final segment of the final edition of Hot Stove of the season, the first-ever Hot Stove Awards was given according to the best animated features, best original screenplays, and best pictures.

References 

Major League Baseball studio shows
MLB Network original programming
2009 American television series debuts
2000s American television talk shows
2010s American television talk shows